WOIL-CD, virtual channel 47 (UHF digital channel 23), is a low-powered, Class A Youtoo America-affiliated television station licensed to Talladega, Alabama, United States.

External links
TV47 Online

Television channels and stations established in 1993
OIL-CD
Low-power television stations in the United States
YTA TV affiliates